Richard Bruce Farleigh (born Richard Buckland Smith, 9 November 1960) is an Australian private investor and reality television personality. He is currently a member of the Business Review Weekly Rich 200 list, a list of the 200 wealthiest Australian individuals. In 2012, he took on the role as Chancellor of London South Bank University. Farleigh featured in series 3 and 4 of BBC's Dragons' Den. He lives in London, United Kingdom. He previously lived in Monte Carlo, Monaco.

Early life 
Born Richard Buckland Smith in Kyabram, Victoria, Australia. His foster family gave him the surname Farleigh. He is a sixth generation Australian. His father was a labourer and sheep shearer. His parents sent him and his other siblings to foster homes when he was aged two. He was one of eleven siblings. Richard was taken into foster care by a family from Peakhurst, Sydney. He attended Narwee Boys' High School, excelled at maths and competitive chess, and then won a scholarship to study economics at the University of New South Wales.

After graduating with honours in the early 1980s, he worked at the Reserve Bank of Australia, then joined Bankers Trust Australia in Sydney when 23 as an investment banker and trader, where he stayed for ten years.

Business 
Farleigh left Australia in the nineties. He was then hired to run a hedge fund in Bermuda and moved there with his wife and baby son. There, he became friends with David Norwood, a chess grand master, and three years later, he decided to retire, aged 34, and moved to Monte Carlo. He then spent much time with Norwood investigating research from Oxford University in the UK that had potential commercial applications. IndexIT was the company formed to fund some of these ventures; it was later sold to Beeson Gregory for £20m. At this time he invested his own capital in British technology companies.

In 1999, Farleigh invested £2m in the renovation of the old French Embassy mansion in London's Portman Square, turning it into the private members club Home House.

In 2005, he published a guide to personal investing entitled Taming the Lion: 100 Secret Strategies for Investing.

The Rich 200 list estimated his personal wealth at around A$160,000,000. He is ranked as the 876th on the Sunday Times Rich List 2006 with an estimated net worth of £66 million.

Several companies Farleigh invested in include: ClearSpeed, Evolution Group, IP2IPO, Proximagen, Home House and Wolfson Microelectronics.

In 2010 Farleigh launched H2O Markets, an advisory firm.

Dragons' Den 
Farleigh was selected in 2006 to appear as an investor on the British version of the business-related TV programme Dragons' Den for the show's third series. Farleigh said he would be seeking further investments through the show, saying he was looking to "hopefully uncover the next big thing". It was announced on 21 May 2007 that Richard Farleigh had been dropped from the series. He was replaced by James Caan.

Chess
Farleigh played for Bermuda in the 31st Chess Olympiad in Moscow 1994 and for Monaco in the 34th Chess Olympiad in Istanbul 2000.

References

External links

The Telegraph (2006). Business profile: From swagman to sapphires. Retrieved 2006-04-23.
The Times (2007). Double blow for UK nanotech company.
The Telegraph (2007).  Farleigh's Oxonica in legal fight with supplier.
The Financial Times (2008).  ‘Dragons’ Den’ chief feels heat in court.
The Guardian (2008).  Court rules against firm backed by former Dragons' Den star.

Business Matters (2010).  Interview with Richard Farleigh on success & failure in business .

1960 births
Living people
Australian chess players
Australian financial analysts
Australian hedge fund managers
Australian investors
Stock and commodity market managers
University of New South Wales alumni
Chess Olympiad competitors
Australian expatriates in Monaco
Australian expatriates in the United Kingdom
People associated with London South Bank University